Nightlight (also known as View of Terror) is a 2003 television film directed by Louis Bélanger.

Plot
The film opens with a voyeur taking pictures of an unknown woman dressing up. He later sets her house on fire while she lies unconscious in the room.

Celeste Timmerman is a woman with a successful career, an attractive boyfriend named Brent, and a good friend she can trust with all of her secrets. Lately, she has done nothing but fight with Brent, and she decides she wants to move out. Although Brent is reluctant about her moving out, Celeste buys a new apartment. Soon an unknown man begins to stalk her repeatedly by telephone. The caller says he can see her. Celeste asks her best friend Tasha for help, and Tasha suggests that Celeste block his phone calls. Meanwhile, Brent is mad over Celeste leaving and starts trying to reach her constantly. Celeste thinks he is the stalker, but Tasha tells her he couldn't be. What Celeste doesn't know is that Tasha is meeting Brent secretly, and is trying to seduce him. He is only interested in Celeste, however, and wants to protect her against the stalker.

Celeste is unable to block the stalker's calls, and he becomes angry with her ignoring him. He warns her not to block his calls, not to call the police, and not to have a boyfriend. He threatens to punish her if she disobeys. Celeste ignores his warnings and contacts a detective. She also purchases a telescope to attempt to find the stalker herself. However, the stalker knows Celeste contacted the police, and calls to inform her that she will be punished. Later, returning home, Celeste finds that her curtains have been removed, and she has a voicemail message from the stalker saying that he could be anywhere in her house. Afraid, Celeste immediately leaves the apartment and contacts the police. However, her house boss later tells her that he took the curtains down because they weren't functioning correctly.

One night, Celeste receives another phone call and tries to locate the stalker while he is talking. Believing she has found him, she contacts her house boss. He tells her that what is happening to her also happened to a woman named Justine Jamison, who vanished one day and was never heard from again. Celeste trusts her hotel guard, Derreck, with her suspicions about the stalker's identity, and he reluctantly sneaks her into her suspect's apartment. She finds out that a man named David Jacobson lives there. Later, two investigators, Detective Gillis and Detective Zamora, pay David a visit and find pictures secretly taken from Celeste. Although David swears he has never seen the pictures, he is taken to the police station.

Celeste reunites with Brent, but she receives another threatening call from the stalker ordering her to get rid of Brent. The stalker says he will get rid of Brent if she doesn't. Celeste's fear returns as she realizes that David can't be the caller, because he is in jail. She tries to contact Justine Jamison, the previous stalking victim, but is unable to reach her. Returning home, Celeste realizes her pet bird is missing.

Later, as she discovers that the stalker has put cameras in her house, Celeste is interrupted with a phone call from Justine. They meet and she tells Celeste that the stalker killed her fiancée. Not much later, the stalker also threatens to kill Brent. In addition, he sends a video message of Celeste's bird, threatening to kill and eat the pet.

In the climactic scene, Derreck leads Celeste to the basement, telling her it is the stalker's hiding place. The stalker is then revealed to be Derreck. Brent, who has also come to the basement, gets into a fight with Derreck. Celeste intervenes just as Derreck is about to kill Brent by hitting the stalker in the head with a pole. The police arrest Derreck. Celeste and Brent are finally set free.

Cast

External links

2003 television films
2003 films
American television films
English-language Canadian films
2003 thriller films
Films directed by Louis Bélanger
Canadian thriller films
Canadian thriller television films
2000s English-language films
2000s Canadian films